Henrique Martins Gomes (born 30 November 1995) is a Portuguese professional footballer who plays for Gil Vicente F.C. as a left-back.

Club career
Born in Barcelos, Braga District, Gomes had two youth spells at local club Gil Vicente FC, the second from ages 14 to 18. He made his senior debut on loan, spending one season apiece with Santa Maria F.C. and Vilaverdense F.C. in the third division; in June 2016, he signed a permanent contract with the latter side.

On 30 May 2018, Gomes joined S.C. Covilhã of the LigaPro. His first professional match took place on 21 July, in a 2–0 away loss against C.D. Mafra in the first round of the Taça da Liga. He made his league debut on 12 August in the 0–0 home draw with Académico de Viseu FC, and scored his first goal the following week to help the visitors win 4–2 at C.D. Cova da Piedade.

Gomes returned to Gil on 24 May 2019, agreeing to a two-year deal. He played his first game in the Primeira Liga on 29 September, starting and finishing the 1–0 away defeat to C.D. Santa Clara.

After 21 appearances (23 in all competitions) and one goal in his first year at the Estádio Cidade de Barcelos, Gomes subsequently acted as backup to Talocha. On 20 June 2021, he signed an extension until 2023.

References

External links

1995 births
Living people
People from Barcelos, Portugal
Sportspeople from Braga District
Portuguese footballers
Association football defenders
Primeira Liga players
Liga Portugal 2 players
Campeonato de Portugal (league) players
Gil Vicente F.C. players
Santa Maria F.C. players
Vilaverdense F.C. players
S.C. Covilhã players